The Man I Want is a 1934 British comedy film directed by Leslie S. Hiscott and starring Henry Kendall, Wendy Barrie and Betty Astell. The screenplay concerns a man who accidentally comes across some stolen jewels. The film was made at Beaconsfield Studios.

Cast
 Henry Kendall as Peter Mason
 Wendy Barrie as Marion Round
 Betty Astell as Prue Darrell
 Davy Burnaby as Sir George Round
 Wally Patch as Crook
 Hal Walters as Crook

References

Bibliography
 Chibnall, Steve. Quota Quickies: The Birth of the British 'B' Film. British Film Institute, 2007.
 Low, Rachael. Filmmaking in 1930s Britain. George Allen & Unwin, 1985.
 Wood, Linda. British Films, 1927-1939. British Film Institute, 1986.

External links

1934 films
1934 comedy films
1930s English-language films
Films directed by Leslie S. Hiscott
British comedy films
Films shot at Beaconsfield Studios
Quota quickies
British black-and-white films
1930s British films